My Kitchen Rules NZ (series 1) is a reality television cooking programme which aired on the TVNZ TV ONE.

Teams 
The teams in this episode were:

Elimination History

Competition details

Instant Restaurant Round

Round 1 - Scores 
 Episodes 1 to 5
 Airdate – 24 Aug to 2 Sep 2014
 Description – Teams were to transform their homes into an 'Instant Restaurant', serving opposing teams and judges a three course meal (Entree, Main and Dessert). All teams are judged and scored by the other teams, and also by Ben and Gareth.

Round 1 - Dishes

Round 2 
 Episodes 6 to 10
 Airdate – 3 Sep to 14 Sep 2014
 Description – Teams were to transform their homes into an 'Instant Restaurant', serving opposing teams and judges a three course meal (Entree, Main and Dessert). All teams are judged and scored by the other teams, and also by Ben and Gareth.

Round 3 
 Episodes 11 to 12
 Airdate – 16 Sep to 24 Sep 2014
 Description –  Teams which placed fourth in the first two Instant Restaurant are joined by three Gatecrashers and had to transform their homes into an 'Instant Restaurant', serving opposing teams and judges a three course meal (Entree, Main and Dessert). All teams are judged and scored by the other teams, and also by Ben and Gareth. Two teams with the lowest score will be eliminated.

Sudden Death - Round 4

People's Choice 1: Ronald McDonald House's Challenge 
 Episodes 16
 Airdate – 28 Sep 2014
 Description –  Competing in a group of three, teams headed into the first challenge to serve a dish. Families will vote by donating for their favourite dish and the group who received the most votes will receive People's Choice, sending them safe from Rapid Cook-Off and Showdown. Judges Ben and Gareth sent the weakest team directly into the first Sudden Death Cook-Off. All other surviving teams are through to the next showdown.

Rapid Cook-Off

45min Mystery Challenge
 Episodes 12 
 Airdate – 17 Nov 2015
 Description – Each team must cook a two course romantic date night meal in 45 minutes.

Showdown - Whole Chicken 
 Description – Teams were given a whole chicken and option to debone it themselves. The losing team will compete in the Elimination Sudden Death.

Sudden Death 
 Episodes 18 
 Airdate – 1 Oct 2014
 Description – Teams compete in the first Sudden Death Cook-Off.

Sudden Death - Round 5

People's Choice 2: Challenge 
 Episodes 19
 Airdate – 5 Oct 2014
 Description –   Families will vote by donating for their favourite dish and the group who received the most votes will receive People's Choice, sending them safe from Rapid Cook-Off and Showdown. Judges Ben and Gareth sent two of the weakest teams directly into the second Sudden Death Cook-Off. All other surviving teams are through to the next showdown.

Rapid Cook-Off

45min Mystery Challenge
 Episodes 20 
 Airdate – 7 Oct 2015
 Description – Each team must cook a protein with a complementary dessert ingredient. All teams are required to use all the ingredients in the box and make the protein the star of the dish.

Showdown - Mystery Protein 
 Description – Teams were given a whole chicken and option to debone it themselves. The losing team will compete in the Elimination Sudden Death.

Sudden Death 
 Episodes 21 
 Airdate – 8 Oct 2014
 Description – In a Double Elimination, the teams compete in the second Sudden Death Cook-Off.

Sudden Death - Round 6

People's Choice 3: Challenge 
 Episodes 22
 Airdate – 12 Oct 2014
 Description –  Teams headed into the third challenge to serve a dish. Families will vote by donating for their favourite dish and the group who received the most votes will receive People's Choice, sending them safe from Rapid Cook-Off and Showdown. Judges Ben and Gareth sent the weakest team directly into the first Sudden Death Cook-Off. All other surviving teams are through to the next showdown.

Rapid Cook-Off

45min Mystery Challenge
 Episodes 23 
 Airdate – 14 Oct 2015
 Description – Each team must cook a romantic date night meal with their choice of ingredients in 45 minutes.

Showdown - Whole Chicken 
 Description – Teams were given a whole chicken and option to debone it themselves. The losing team will compete in the Elimination Sudden Death.

Sudden Death 
 Episodes 24 
 Airdate – 15 Oct 2014
 Description – Teams compete in the third Sudden Death Cook-Off.

Sudden Death - Round 70

People's Choice 4: Challenge 
 Episodes 25
 Airdate – 19 Oct 2014
 Description –  Teams headed into the third challenge to serve a dish. Families will vote by donating for their favourite dish and the group who received the most votes will receive People's Choice, sending them safe from Rapid Cook-Off and Showdown. Judges Ben and Gareth sent the weakest team directly into the first Sudden Death Cook-Off. All other surviving teams are through to the next showdown.

Rapid Cook-Off

45min Mystery Challenge
 Episodes 26 
 Airdate – 21 Oct 2015
 Description – Each team must cook a romantic date night meal.

Showdown - Chocolate 
 Description – Teams had to create two portions of their best chocolate dish. The losing team will compete in the Elimination Sudden Death.

Sudden Death 
 Episodes 27 
 Airdate – 22 Oct 2014
 Description – Teams compete in the fourth Sudden Death Cook-Off.

Semi-finals

Semi-final 1
 Episodes 31
 Airdate – 26 Oct 2014
 Description – Two teams in the first Semi-Final Cook-Off. The lower scoring team is eliminated and the winner proceeds through to the Grand Final.

Semi-Final 2 
 Episodes 32 
 Airdate – 28 Oct 2014
 Description – Two teams in the second Semi-Final Cook-Off. The lower scoring team is eliminated and the other team becomes the second team to proceed into the Grand Final.

Grand-Final  
 Episodes 33 
 Airdate – 29 Oct 2014
 Description – In the final cook-off for the series, the top two teams face-off in the ultimate Grand Final. Teams each cook a five course degustation in the format of a cold entree, hot entree, seafood main, meat main and dessert. Twenty plates of each course, totalling 100 plates per team were served to all eliminated teams, friends and family. Guest judges returned for the final verdict of awarding the $100,000 prize to the winners. Teams also wear chef attire and have their Instant Restaurant represented.

Episodes

References

External links
 Official site

2014 New Zealand television seasons
My Kitchen Rules